Brett Sheehan (born 16 September 1979) is an Australian rugby union and rugby league footballer. He was also included in Australia's squad for matches during the 2006 Tri Nations Series.

Sheehan previously played for the Queensland Reds, playing four Super 12 matches for them in 2005. He then moved back to Sydney to play for the Waratahs for the 2006 season. At the conclusion of the 2008 season Brett announced that he would be moving to the Western Force franchise. He earned a call-up into the Wallaby squad, during the coaching era of John Connolly. Sheehan has also played rugby league in the past, having played for a number clubs in the National Rugby League, such as the Brisbane Broncos, Manly-Warringah Sea Eagles and South Sydney Rabbitohs.

External links
Western Force profile
NRL stats
itsrugby.co.uk profile

1979 births
Living people
Australia international rugby union players
Australian rugby league players
Australian rugby union players
Expatriate rugby union players in England
New South Wales Waratahs players
People educated at St Joseph's College, Hunters Hill
Sportspeople from Geraldton
Queensland Reds players
Rugby league halfbacks
Rugby union scrum-halves
South Sydney Rabbitohs players
Sportsmen from Western Australia
Wasps RFC players
Western Force players
Rugby union players from Western Australia